Dingaan Bongane Thobela (born 24 September 1966), is a South African former professional boxer who competed between 1990 and 2006. He is a world champion in two weight classes, having held the WBO lightweight title from 1990 to 1992, the WBA lightweight in 1993, and the WBC super-middleweight title in 2000.

Professional career
After compiling an amateur record of 80–3, Thobela, known as "The Rose of Soweto", turned pro in 1986 and won the WBO Lightweight Title in 1990 after beating Mauricio Aceves. After defending the belt three times, he relinquished the title and then challenged WBA Lightweight Title holder Tony Lopez in 1993, but lost a hotly disputed decision. Later that year he rematched Lopez, and won a decision to win the title. Battling to make the weight, he lost the title in his first defense to Orzubek Nazarov, and lost a rematch to Nazarov in 1994. He stopped WBF junior welterweight champion Kenny Vice in a non-title fight shortly after that.

Thobela later moved up significantly in weight class, and in the twilight of his career in 2000 took on WBC Super Middleweight Title holder Glenn Catley, winning the belt via a 12th-round KO in only his second fight at the higher weight limit. He again lost the title in his first defense to Dave Hilton Jr via controversial split decision. The loss to Hilton was the beginning of the end for Thobela, who lost his next five fights, including a TKO loss to Eric Lucas for the WBC Super Middleweight Title in 2001 as well as later champions Mikkel Kessler and Lucian Bute.

Comeback
Thobela returned to the ring at the age of 40 and after an absence of nearly two years on 27 October 2006 when he challenged Soon Botes for the South African light heavyweight title at the Wembley Indoor Arena in Johannesburg, South Africa. He had defeated Botes back in 2000 to win the South African Super middleweight title. Many were surprised that the bout was sanctioned as Thobela failed to make the weight and his inactivity and age. Although Thobela dropped Botes he was clearly not conditioned to fight and did not come out for the tenth round.

Professional boxing record

See also
List of world lightweight boxing champions
List of world super-middleweight boxing champions

References

Further reading
 Potgieter, Deon (2009) Rose of Soweto: The Dingaan Thobela Story Penguin, Johannesburg, South Africa,

External links

 

1966 births
Living people
South African male boxers
Sportspeople from Soweto
Welterweight boxers
World Boxing Organization champions
World Boxing Association champions
World Boxing Council champions
World lightweight boxing champions
World super-middleweight boxing champions